Plane Mad is an Irish direct action group that campaigns against the aviation industry's contribution to climate change. It was established in 2007, and is a sister group to the British group Plane Stupid. It is a non-hierarchical organisation. Its four main demands are:

An end to airport expansion
An end to subsidies for internal flights
A ban on advertising of aviation
A tax on aviation fuel

In September 2008, it interrupted the Ryanair AGM at Dublin Airport, during CEO Michael O'Leary's speech. In November 2008, it interrupted a speech by Green Party Minister for the Environment, Heritage and Local Government John Gormley in north Dublin in protest at the planned expansion of Dublin Airport.

External links
 Plane Mad website (As of February 6, 2017, this is no longer in service)

References

Civil disobedience
Climate change organizations
Environmental protests in the Republic of Ireland
Radical environmentalism
Protests in the Republic of Ireland
Aviation and the environment